Marek Hrivík (born August 28, 1991) is a Slovak professional ice hockey forward currently playing for Leksands IF of the Swedish Hockey League (SHL).

Playing career
Hrivík won the President's Cup in 2009–10 with the Moncton Wildcats of the Quebec Major Junior Hockey League. On May 30, 2012, Hrivík signed his first NHL contract on a three-year entry-level contract with the New York Rangers.

He made his NHL debut for the Rangers in a game against the Detroit Red Wings on February 21, 2016.

On July 1, 2017, after five full seasons within the Rangers organization, Hrivík left as a free agent and was signed to a one-year, two-way contract with the Calgary Flames. In the 2017–18 season, he was first assigned to AHL affiliate, the Stockton Heat. Having suffered through injury, Hrivík responded to produce 30 points in 32 games. He was later recalled to appear in 3 scoreless games with the Flames.

Opting to leave the Flames in the off-season, Hrivík continued his career abroad, agreeing to a one-year deal with Russian club HC Vityaz of the KHL on July 1, 2018. In the 2018–19 season, Hrivík added eight goals and 15 points in 26 games with Vityaz before his season was cut short due to injury.

As a free agent, Hrivík left the KHL and agreed to a one-year deal with the newly promoted Swedish club, Leksands IF of the Swedish Hockey League (SHL), on 16 August 2019.

Hrivík remained with Leksands for the 2020–21 season, increasing his scoring output to lead the team and the league in scoring with 37 assists and 51 points in just 44 regular season games. He was selected as the SHL's forward of the year and was awarded the Guldhjälmen as the SHL's most valuable player.

On 1 May 2021, Hrivík opted to leave the SHL and return to the KHL, signing a one-year contract with Russian outfit Torpedo Nizhny Novgorod. In the 2021–22 season, Hrivík contributed offensively with nine goals and 23 points through 44 regular season games. With Torpedo missing the post-season for the first time in 9 years, Hrivík continued his season by returning to his former club, Leksands IF of the SHL, on 15 February 2022.

Career statistics

Regular season and playoffs
Bold indicates led league

International

Awards and honors

References

External links

1991 births
Living people
People from Čadca
Sportspeople from the Žilina Region
Slovak ice hockey left wingers
Barys Astana draft picks
Calgary Flames players
Connecticut Whale (AHL) players
Hartford Wolf Pack players
Leksands IF players
Moncton Wildcats players
New York Rangers players
Ice hockey players at the 2022 Winter Olympics
Olympic ice hockey players of Slovakia
Medalists at the 2022 Winter Olympics
Olympic bronze medalists for Slovakia
Olympic medalists in ice hockey
Stockton Heat players
Torpedo Nizhny Novgorod players
Undrafted National Hockey League players
HC Vityaz players
Slovak expatriate ice hockey players in the United States
Slovak expatriate ice hockey players in Canada
Slovak expatriate ice hockey players in Russia
Slovak expatriate ice hockey players in Sweden